Inflatozaena inflata is a species of beetle in the family Carabidae, the only species in the genus Inflatozaena.

References

Paussinae